The Mercer college football team represents Mercer University as a member of the Southern Conference (SoCon). The Bears competes as part of the NCAA Division I Football Championship Subdivision. The program has had 20 head coaches, since it began play during the 1891 season. Since December 2019, Drew Cronic has served as head coach at Mercer.

Key

Coaches

Notes

References 

Mercer

Mercer Bears head football coaches